Major General Leonard Holland (April 9, 1916 – August 16, 1999) was an American military officer from Rhode Island.  He served as the Adjutant General of Rhode Island for 22 years from 1961 to 1983, longer than anyone else.

Biography
Leonard Holland was born in Providence, Rhode Island on April 9, 1916.

World War II
He enlisted in the United States Army on April 16, 1941, eight months before the Japanese attack on Pearl Harbor.  During World War II he served in the Pacific Theater with the 43rd Infantry Division in the Solomon Islands and New Guinea and received the Combat Infantryman Badge, Bronze Star Medal and the Purple Heart.

He was commissioned a second lieutenant in the Infantry branch on August 6, 1942.  He rose through the ranks and was promoted to major on February 12, 1946, shortly before being discharged from active duty.

After the war, Holland became an officer in the Officers Reserve Corps (i.e. Army Reserve).  As a lieutenant colonel, he served as commander of the 1st Battalion, 385th Infantry Regiment.  Holland received a state promotion to colonel in January 1959.  He also graduated from the United States Army Command and General Staff College and the Infantry Officers Advanced Course in 1959.

Adjutant General of Rhode Island
Late in 1960 he was selected by Rhode Island Governor elect John A. Notte to become Adjutant General of Rhode Island in command of the Rhode Island National Guard.  Holland received federal recognition as a colonel on January 2, 1961 and then as a major general on March 16, 1961, shortly before his forty-fifth birthday.  Although Notte was defeated for re-election, Holland went on to serve under four more governors before he retired.

During Holland's tenure as Adjutant General, two units of the Rhode Island National Guard were called to federal active duty.  They were the 115th Military Police Company which was assigned to the United States Military Academy at West Point, New York and the 107th Signal Company which was deployed to Vietnam from 1967 to 1968.  The 107th was one of only eight National Guard units to be deployed to Vietnam.  General Holland went to Vietnam to visit the soldiers of the 107th, making him one of the few Adjutants General of Rhode Island to visit an active combat theater.

In February 1978 Rhode Island was buried in over three feet of snow in the Blizzard of 1978.  This led to the Rhode Island National Guard being mobilized to deal with emergency situations and return the state to a more normal condition.  General Holland oversaw the operations of over 3,000 Guardsmen which rendered invaluable assistance in the weeks following the blizzard.

In 1981 General Holland was inducted into the Rhode Island Heritage Hall of Fame.

In 2018 General Holland was inducted into the Pawtucket Hall of Fame.

Retirement
General Holland retired from the Army in August 1983 and was awarded the Distinguished Service Medal and the rarely awarded Rhode Island Cross, Rhode Island's highest military decoration.  He was succeeded by Major General John W. Kiely, a veteran of World War II, Korea and Vietnam.

He died on August 16, 1999 after suffering a stroke.  He is buried in Lincoln Park Cemetery in Warwick, Rhode Island.

Legacy
After General Holland's retirement, the Rhode Island General Assembly passed a law that Adjutants General of Rhode Island would be limited to two five year terms in office.

Awards
Combat Infantryman Badge
Distinguished Service Medal
Legion of Merit
Bronze Star Medal
Army Commendation Medal
Purple Heart
Army Reserve Components Achievement Medal with oak leaf cluster
American Defense Service Medal
American Campaign Medal
Asiatic-Pacific Campaign Medal with campaign star
Army of Occupation Medal
National Defense Service Medal with star
Humanitarian Service Medal
Armed Forces Reserve Medal with three hourglass devices
Rhode Island Cross
Rhode Island National Guard Service Medal
Rhode Island Emergency Service Ribbon with Pendant

References

1916 births
1999 deaths
People from Providence, Rhode Island
United States Army soldiers
United States Army personnel of World War II
United States Army officers
United States Army reservists
Rhode Island National Guard personnel
United States Army Command and General Staff College alumni
Recipients of the Legion of Merit
National Guard (United States) generals
Recipients of the Distinguished Service Medal (US Army)